Luiz Gustavo Tavares Conde (born 12 February 1994), known as Luiz Gustavo, is a Brazilian footballer who plays as a defender for Mirassol-SP.

References

External links

1994 births
Living people
People from Votuporanga
Brazilian footballers
Association football defenders
Campeonato Brasileiro Série A players
Campeonato Brasileiro Série B players
Sociedade Esportiva Palmeiras players
Esporte Clube Vitória players
Associação Ferroviária de Esportes players
Avaí FC players
Oeste Futebol Clube players
CR Vasco da Gama players
Footballers from São Paulo (state)